"Over Load" is Mika Nakashima's 28th single, released on 13 May 2009. The carrier track, "Over Load," was used in the May 2009 Lipton Limone Commercial wherein Mika was the commercial model.

Over Load and its B-side, "No Answer," are best described as light pop songs with oriental string-based backgrounds.

Track listing

Live performances
 05/15 - Music Station
 05/15 - Music Fighter
 05/16 - CD TV
 05/17 - Utaban

Oricon Singles Chart (Japan)

2009 singles
Mika Nakashima songs
2009 songs